Trillium govanianum (Hindi name: nag chhatri) is a high-value medicinal herb belonging to the family Melanthiaceae and is mainly distributed from Pakistan to Bhutan between the altitudinal ranges of 2500–4000 metres above sea level across the Himalayan region. It is a native species of the Himalayas, usually preferring shady areas in the forest for its profuse growth.

The plant is a small herb and can be identified by its three leaves in one whorl at the summit of the stem and a solitary, purple flower in the centre. Leaves are broadly ovate, acute and conspicuously stalked.

Overexploitation and uprooting of this medicinal plant from natural habitat, to meet pharmaceutical industry demands has made the made a global threat to the population of nag chhatri with the small geographical niche. The rhizome part of T. govanianum has a high amount of steroidal saponins such as borassoside E and upon hydrolysis yield >2.5% diosgenin which is used for the preparation of steroidal and sex hormones (Shivam et al. 2016).

Researchers from CSIR-IHBT, Palampur, India working on the T. govanianum to decipher its chemical constituents, genetic composition and vegetative propagation methods. Moreover, only 13 phytoconstituents were isolated from the rhizome part of T. govanianum, including 10 steroidal saponins(Ismail et al. 2015; Singh, et al. 2020a), two phytoecdysteroids, and one trihydrylated fatty acids (Rahman et al. 2017). Apart from that approximately, 24 steroidal saponins in parent extract (Singh et al. 2020b) and nine hydrophilic compounds in n-Hexane fraction (Khan et al. 2019) were tentatively identified in T. govanianum by UPLC-ESI-MS/MS and GC/MS respectively. The extract Fractions and isolated steroidal saponins from T. govanianum have exhibited insecticidal (Dolma et al., 2020), pro-diabetic enzymes inhibition (Patil et al. 2021), and anti-inflammatory (Patil et al., 2021) activity.

The government of Himachal Pradesh, J&K, are taking crucial steps to stop the illegal trade of Trillium and there are also many police cases behind its large collection and transportation from one place to other.

References

 Dolma Shudh Kirti, Patil Shivprasad Suresh¸ Prithvi Pal Singh¸ Upendra Sharma¸ S.G. Eswara Reddy. Insecticidal activity of the extract, fractions and pure steroidal saponins of Trillium govanianum Wall. ex D. Don for the control of diamondback moth (Plutella xylostella L.) and aphid (Aphis craccivora Koch). Pest Management Science, 2020, 77(2):956-962. Ismail, M., Shah, M. R., Adhikari, A., Anis, I., Ahmad, M. S., & Khurram, M. (2015). Govanoside A, a new steroidal saponin from rhizomes of Trillium govanianum. Steroids, 104, 270–275.
 Khan, K. M., Sarker, S. D., Khan, G. A., Saleem, H., Khan, S. A., & Mannan, A. (2019). Phytochemical profiling and evaluation of modified resazurin microtiter plate assay of the roots of Trillium govanianum. Natural Product Research, 1-5.
 Patil Shivprasad Suresh, Prithvi Pal Singh, Yogendra S Padwad, Upendra Sharma. Steroidal Saponins from Trillium govanianum as α-Amylase, α-Glucosidase, and Dipeptidyl Peptidase IV Inhibitory Agents. Journal of Pharmacy and Pharmacology, 2021, 73(4):487-495. 
 Patil Shivprasad Suresh, Prithvi Pal Singh, Anamika Sharma, Yogendra S Padwad, Upendra Sharma. Anti-inflammatory and pharmacokinetics studies of steroidal saponins isolated from Trillium govanianum. Biocatalysis and Agricultural Biotechnology, 2021 
 Rahman, S. U., Adhikari, A., Ismail, M., Shah, M. R., Khurram, M., Anis, I., & Ali, F. (2017). A new trihydroxylated fatty acid and phytoecdysteroids from rhizomes of Trillium govanianum. Natural Products Record, 3, 5.
 Sanjay Kr. Uniyal and Arunava Datta (2012). Nagchhatri- A Plant in Peril. Journal of Biodiversity Management & Forestry. 1:1
 Shalini Vidyarthi, S. S. Samant and Pankaj Sharma (2013). Dwindling status of Trillium govanianum Wall. ex D.Don-A case study from kullu district of Himachal Pradesh, India. Journal of medicinal plant research, 7(8), 392-397
 Shivam Sharma, Arun Sharma, Vineet Mehta, Rajinder S. Chauhan, Udayabanu M, Hemant Sood (2016). Efficient Hydroalcoholic Extraction for Highest Diosgenin Content from Trillium Govanianum (Nag chhatri) and it's in Vitro Anticancerous Activity. Asian Journal of Pharmaceutical and Clinical Research, 9 (4): 386-392
Singh, Prithvi.P., Bora, Prateek, S., Patil, Shivprasad.S., Bhatt, V. and Sharma, U., 2020b. Qualitative and quantitative determination of steroidal saponins in Trillium govanianum by UHPLC‐QTOF‐MS/MS and UHPLC‐ELSD. Phytochemical Analysis, doi.org/10.1002/pca.2951.
Singh, Prithvi.P., Patil, Shivprasad.S., Bora, Prateek.S., Bhatt, V. and Sharma, U., 2020a. Govanoside B, a new steroidal saponin from rhizomes of Trillium govanianum''. Natural Product Research, doi: 10.1080/14786419.2020.1761360.

External links 
 

govanianum